Santanta may be an alternate spelling of:
Santana (disambiguation)
Satanta (disambiguation)
Setanta (disambiguation)